Thomas Clive Davies (born 7 November 1951) is a former Welsh cricketer.  Davies was a right-handed batsman who bowled slow left-arm orthodox.  He was born in Pontrhydyfen, Glamorgan.

Having spent time on the staff at Lord's in 1969 and 1970, Davies made his first-class debut for Glamorgan against Leicestershire in the 1971 County Championship and in his first game he took three first-innings wickets for 22 runs, but these proved to be the best bowling figures of his career. He made five further first-class appearances for Glamorgan in 1971, and returned in 1972 for a single match against Cambridge University.

References

External links
Clive Davies at ESPNcricinfo
Clive Davies at CricketArchive

1951 births
Living people
Cricketers from Neath Port Talbot
Welsh cricketers
Glamorgan cricketers